The Wheelchair Challenge Cup is a wheelchair rugby league  competition organised by the Rugby Football League.

Finals

See also

Challenge Cup
Women's Challenge Cup

References

 

 
Wheelchair rugby competitions
Wheelchair rugby league